In algebra, a finitely generated group is a group G that has some finite generating set S so that every element of G can be written as the combination (under the group operation) of finitely many elements of  S and of inverses of such elements. 

By definition, every finite group is finitely generated, since S can be taken to be G itself. Every infinite finitely generated group must be countable but countable groups need not be finitely generated. The additive group of rational numbers Q is an example of a countable group that is not finitely generated.

Examples 
 Every quotient of a finitely generated group G is finitely generated; the quotient group is generated by the images of the generators of G under the canonical projection.
 A subgroup of a finitely generated group need not be finitely generated.
 A group that is generated by a single element is called cyclic. Every infinite cyclic group is isomorphic to the additive group of the integers Z.
 A locally cyclic group is a group in which every finitely generated subgroup is cyclic.
 The free group on a finite set is finitely generated by the elements of that set (§Examples).
 A fortiori, every finitely presented group (§Examples) is finitely generated.

Finitely generated Abelian groups

Every Abelian group can be seen as a module over the ring of integers Z, and in a finitely generated Abelian group with generators x1, ..., xn, every group element x can be written as a linear combination of these generators,
x = α1⋅x1 + α2⋅x2 + ... + αn⋅xn
with integers α1, ..., αn.

Subgroups of a finitely generated Abelian group are themselves finitely generated.

The fundamental theorem of finitely generated abelian groups states that a finitely generated Abelian group is the direct sum of a free Abelian group of finite rank and a finite Abelian group, each of which are unique up to isomorphism.

Subgroups
A subgroup of a finitely generated group need not be finitely generated. The commutator subgroup of the free group  on two generators is an example of a subgroup of a finitely generated group that is not finitely generated.

On the other hand, all subgroups of a finitely generated Abelian group are finitely generated.

A subgroup of finite index in a finitely generated group is always finitely generated, and the Schreier index formula gives a bound on the number of generators required.

In 1954, Albert G. Howson showed that the intersection of two finitely generated subgroups of a free group is again finitely generated.

The lattice of subgroups of a group satisfies the ascending chain condition if and only if all subgroups of the group are finitely generated. A group such that all its subgroups are finitely generated is called Noetherian.

A group such that every finitely generated subgroup is finite is called locally finite. Every locally finite group is periodic, i.e., every element has finite order. Conversely, every periodic abelian group is locally finite.

Applications 

Geometric group theory studies the connections between algebraic properties of finitely generated groups and topological and geometric properties of spaces on which these groups act.

Related notions
The word problem for a finitely generated group is the decision problem whether two words in the generators of the group represent the same element. The word problem for a given finitely generated group is solvable if and only if the group can be embedded in every algebraically closed group.

The rank of a group is often defined to be the smallest cardinality of a generating set for the group. By definition, the rank of a finitely generated group is finite.

See also
 Finitely generated module
 Presentation of a group

Notes

References
 

Group theory
Properties of groups